Salting is a labor union tactic involving the act of getting a job at a specific workplace with the intent of organizing a union. A person so employed is called a "salt".

The tactic is often discussed in the United States because under US law unions may be prohibited from talking with workers in the workplace and salting is one of the few legal strategies that allow union organizers to talk with workers. Both the Knights of Labor and the Industrial Workers of the World employed salts.  The IWW continues to use salts, especially in their Starbucks Workers Campaign.

In Toering Elec. Co., 351 N.L.R.B. No. 18 (Sept. 29, 2007), the National Labor Relations Board (NLRB) concluded that workers in the United States can be fired if they are believed to not be "genuinely interested" in obtaining the job. This category includes salting.

References

Trade unions in the United States
Tactics